Kolosh Glacier is the 6.7 km long and 3.6 km wide glacier on Magnier Peninsula, Graham Coast on the west side of Antarctic Peninsula, situated south of Nesla Glacier.  It drains the west slopes of Lisiya Ridge north of Mount Bigo, and flows northwestwards into Bigo Bay next south of the terminus  of Nesla Glacier.

The glacier is named after Kolosh Peak in Konyavska Mountain, Western Bulgaria.

Location
British mapping in 1971.

Maps
 British Antarctic Territory.  Scale 1:200000 topographic map. DOS 610 Series, Sheet W 65 64.  Directorate of Overseas Surveys, Tolworth, UK, 1971.
 Antarctic Digital Database (ADD). Scale 1:250000 topographic map of Antarctica. Scientific Committee on Antarctic Research (SCAR), 1993–2016.

References
 Bulgarian Antarctic Gazetteer. Antarctic Place-names Commission. (details in Bulgarian, basic data in English)
 SCAR Composite Gazetteer of Antarctica.

External links
 Kolosh Glacier. Copernix satellite image

Bulgaria and the Antarctic
Glaciers of Graham Coast